Luiz Felipe Guimarães Andreoli (São Paulo, February 5, 1980) is a Brazilian journalist and humorist. Currently is part of the program Custe o Que Custar, on the Rede Bandeirantes network, also presenting Band's new sports show, Deu Olé.

References

External links
 
 
 

1980 births
Living people
Brazilian people of Italian descent
Brazilian male comedians